Mary Berg is a Canadian television host, author and cook, most noted as the winner of the third season of MasterChef Canada. She has been the host of two television cooking shows, Mary's Kitchen Crush and Mary Makes It Easy, and has released two cookbooks, Kitchen Party and Well Seasoned.

Early life 
Berg was born in Pickering, Ontario. When she was four years old, Berg was in a car accident in which her father died. Her mother and brother survived the accident with injuries. Berg helped out preparing meals for her family from about age 7 and by age 13 was cooking dinner for her family on her own.

Berg obtained her bachelor's degree from Wilfrid Laurier University, double majoring in history and English. She then pursued a master's degree in information science at the University of Toronto.

Career 
After university, Berg became an insurance broker. She left her job to compete in MasterChef Canada in 2016. Berg was the winner of season 3 of MasterChef Canada and the first ever female winner of the show.

Since winning MasterChef Canada, Berg has appeared as a regular food expert on television shows like Your Morning and The Marilyn Denis Show. In 2017, Berg starred in an eight-episode cooking show on Gusto called Mary's Big Kitchen Party.

Berg is the first MasterChef Canada winner to host her own cooking show, Mary's Kitchen Crush. The show premiered on CTV in April 2019. Mary's Kitchen Crush won the Canadian Screen Award for Best Lifestyle Series, and Berg won for Best Lifestyle Host, at the 8th Canadian Screen Awards in 2020. Mary’s Kitchen Crush won the Canadian Screen Award for Best Lifestyle Series again in 2021 at the 9th Canadian Screen Awards, where Berg also won Best Lifestyle Host.

Berg's first cookbook, Kitchen Party, was published in September 2019.

In 2021, Berg premiered the new series Mary Makes It Easy, designed around simple, easy-to-make recipes for people who struggle with their cooking skills, on CTV Life Channel. That same year, she released her second cookbook, Well Seasoned. Well seasoned won the gold medal at the 2022 Taste Canada Awards for best general cookbook.

On April 6, 2022, Berg won the Canadian Screen Award for Host, Lifestyle at the 10th Canadian Screen Awards. Mary Makes It Easy also won the award for Lifestyle Program or Series, on which Berg is a co-executive producer.

In February 2022, Mary Makes It Easy premiered on Food Network in the USA. She served as co-host for the CTV show, Cross Country Cake Off, which premiered in December 2022.

Bibliography 

 Kitchen Party: Effortless Recipes for Every Occasion (Appetite by Random House, 2019)
Well Seasoned: A Year's Worth of Delicious Recipes (Appetite by Random House, 2021)

Personal life 
Berg lives in Toronto, Ontario with her husband, engineer Aaron Mariash. She has been a Pescatarian for more than 15 years, though she cooks meat on her show.

References

External links 

 

Canadian television chefs
Participants in Canadian reality television series
21st-century Canadian women writers
Women cookbook writers
MasterChef Canada
Wilfrid Laurier University alumni
University of Toronto alumni
People from Pickering, Ontario
1990 births
Living people
Canadian Screen Award winners
Canadian cookbook writers
Canadian women chefs